Rabija Dervishi (born 20 March 2000) is a Macedonian footballer who plays as a midfielder for 1. liga club Kamenica Sasa and the North Macedonia women's national team.

References

2000 births
Living people
Women's association football midfielders
Macedonian women's footballers
North Macedonia women's international footballers
Albanian footballers from North Macedonia
ŽFK Kamenica Sasa players
ŽFK Dragon 2014 players